Informally, the reconstruction conjecture in graph theory says that graphs are determined uniquely by their subgraphs.  It is due to Kelly and Ulam.

Formal statements 

Two graphs that have the same deck are said to be hypomorphic.

With these definitions, the conjecture can be stated as:

 Reconstruction Conjecture: Any two hypomorphic graphs on at least three vertices are isomorphic.

 (The requirement that the graphs have at least three vertices is necessary because both graphs on two vertices have the same decks.)

Harary suggested a stronger version of the conjecture:

 Set Reconstruction Conjecture: Any two graphs on at least four vertices with the same sets of vertex-deleted subgraphs are isomorphic.

 Edge Reconstruction Conjecture: (Harary, 1964) Any two graphs with at least four edges and having the same edge-decks are isomorphic.

Recognizable properties

In context of the reconstruction conjecture, a graph property is called recognizable if one can determine the property from the deck of a graph.  The following properties of graphs are recognizable:

Hence  
Number of edges of the graph – The number of edges in a graph  with  vertices,  is recognizable.
Degree sequence – The degree sequence of a graph  is recognizable because the degree of every vertex is recognizable. To find the degree of a vertex —the vertex absent from the ith member of —, we will examine the graph created by deleting it, . If we can tell the degree of every vertex in the graph, we can tell the degree sequence of the graph.
(Vertex-)Connectivity – By definition, a graph is -vertex-connected when deleting any vertex creates a -vertex-connected graph; thus, if every card is a -vertex-connected graph, we know the original graph was -vertex-connected. We can also determine if the original graph was connected, as this is equivalent to having any two of the  being connected.
Tutte polynomial
Characteristic polynomial
Planarity
The types of spanning trees in a graph
Chromatic polynomial
Being a perfect graph or an interval graph, or certain other subclasses of perfect graphs

Verification

Both the reconstruction and set reconstruction conjectures have been verified for all graphs with at most 13 vertices by Brendan McKay. 

In a probabilistic sense, it has been shown by Béla Bollobás that almost all graphs are reconstructible.  This means that the probability that a randomly chosen graph on  vertices is not reconstructible goes to 0 as  goes to infinity.  In fact, it was shown that not only are almost all graphs reconstructible, but in fact that the entire deck is not necessary to reconstruct them — almost all graphs have the property that there exist three cards in their deck that uniquely determine the graph.

Reconstructible graph families

The conjecture has been verified for a number of infinite classes of graphs (and, trivially, their complements).

Regular graphs - Regular Graphs are reconstructible by direct application of some of the facts that can be recognized from the deck of a graph. Given an -regular graph  and its deck , we can recognize that the deck is of a regular graph by recognizing its degree sequence. Let us now examine one member of the deck , . We can add a vertex to this graph and then connect it to the  vertices of degree  to create an -regular graph which is isomorphic to the graph which we started with. Therefore, all regular graphs are reconstructible from their decks. A particular type of regular graph which is interesting is the complete graph. 
Trees
Disconnected graphs
Unit interval graphs 
Separable graphs without end vertices
Maximal planar graphs
Maximal outerplanar graphs
Outerplanar graphs
Critical blocks

Reduction
The reconstruction conjecture is true if all 2-connected graphs are reconstructible.

Duality

Edge reconstruction does not obey any such duality: Indeed, for some classes of edge-reconstructible graphs it is not known if their complements are edge reconstructible.

Other structures

It has been shown that the following are not in general reconstructible:

 Digraphs: Infinite families of non-reconstructible digraphs are known, including tournaments (Stockmeyer) and non-tournaments (Stockmeyer). A tournament is reconstructible if it is not strongly connected. A weaker version of the reconstruction conjecture has been conjectured for digraphs, see new digraph reconstruction conjecture.
 Hypergraphs (Kocay).
 Infinite graphs.  Let T be a tree on an infinite number of vertices such that every vertex has infinite degree, and let nT be the disjoint union of n copies of T. These graphs are hypomorphic, and thus not reconstructible. Every vertex-deleted subgraph of any of these graphs is isomorphic: they all are the disjoint union of an infinite number of copies of T.
 Locally finite graphs. The question of reconstructibility for locally finite infinite trees (the Harary-Schwenk-Scott conjecture from 1972) was a longstanding open problem until 2017, when a non-reconstructible tree of maximum degree 3 was found by Bowler et al.

See also

 New digraph reconstruction conjecture
 Partial symmetry

Further reading
For further information on this topic, see the survey by Nash-Williams.

References

Conjectures
Unsolved problems in graph theory